Bangor is a rural locality in the local government area of Launceston, in the Launceston region of Tasmania. The 2016 census determined a population of 76 for the state suburb of Bangor.

History
The locality was gazetted in 1964.

Geography
The Pipers River forms the western boundary.

Road infrastructure
The C811 route (Bangor Road) enters from the south-west and runs through to the north-west before exiting. Route C820 (Paling Track) starts at an intersection with C811 and runs east before exiting, where it then follows the eastern boundary to the north for a short distance.

References

Launceston, Tasmania
Localities of City of Launceston
Towns in Tasmania